The National Scientific and Technical Research Council (CONICET) is an Argentine government agency which directs and co-ordinates most of the scientific and technical research done in universities and institutes.

It was established on 5 February 1958 by a decree of the national government. Its first director was Nobel Laureate Bernardo A. Houssay.

Governed by a board independent from the federal government, it funds scientific research in three basic ways. Firstly, it gives grants for collective work to research teams of well-recognized scientists of every discipline, including social sciences and the humanities. Secondly, it has a payroll of about 6,500 researchers and 2,500 technicians working as employees in different categories, from investigador asistente (assistant researcher) to investigador principal (main researcher).  Thirdly, it grants scholarships for doctoral and post-doctoral studies to 8,500 young researchers from Argentina and other countries.

Ranking
In 2022, CONICET was ranked as the best Latin American government research institution by the Scimago Institutions Ranking and the 2nd among all research institutions in the region after the Universidade de São Paulo. At the global level, CONICET holds the 141st position among the most prestigious 8084 research institutions worldwide (including universities, governmental and private research institutions, research councils, etc.).

Notable members
 Carlos J. Gradin—Argentine archaeologist and member of CONICET

See also 

 INAPL—Government organization that works with CONICET

References

External links

 
 Condiciones para acceder a una beca y a la carrera 

Scientific organisations based in Argentina
Government agencies of Argentina
Research councils
Members of the International Council for Science
Research funding agencies
Members of the International Science Council